Muagututiʻa Moevasa Tauoa  is an American Samoan politician and member of the American Samoa Senate.

Muagututiʻa is from Fagaʻitua. He was elected to the Senate in November 2016. He was re-elected at the 2020 election.

References

Living people
People from Eastern District, American Samoa
American Samoan politicians
American Samoa Senators
Year of birth missing (living people)